Yi Prefecture or Yizhou may refer to:

 Yizhou (Southwest China), a historical province of China covering Southwest China
 Yi Prefecture (Shandong), active between the 7th and 18th centuries
 Yi Prefecture (Guangxi), active between the 7th and 13th centuries
 Yi Prefecture (Hebei)
 Yi Prefecture (Korea), now known as Uiju or Uiju County
 Yizhou District, Hechi, district of Hechi, Guangxi named after the historical prefecture
 Yizhou District, Hami, district of Hami, Xinjiang
 Yizhou (island), an island described in historical texts that is possibly Taiwan

See also
 Yi (disambiguation)